Pogonocherus is a genus of flat-faced longhorn beetles in the family Cerambycidae.

Species
Pogonocherus decoratus Fairmaire, 1855
Pogonocherus fasciculatus (De Geer, 1775)
Pogonocherus inermicollis Reitter, 1894
Pogonocherus jaekeli Zang, 1905 †
Pogonocherus ovatoides Rapuzzi & Sama, 2014
Pogonocherus ovatus (Goeze, 1777)
Pogonocherus penicillatus Le Conte in Agassiz, 1850
Pogonocherus propinquus Fall, 1910
Pogonocherus ressli Holzschuh, 1977
Pogonocherus anatolicus Daniel, 1898
Pogonocherus arizonicus Schäffer, 1908
Pogonocherus caroli Mulsant, 1863
Pogonocherus cedri Peyerimhoff, 1916
Pogonocherus creticus Kratochvil, 1985
Pogonocherus dimidiatus Blessig, 1873
Pogonocherus eugeniae Ganglbauer, 1891
Pogonocherus hispidulus (Piller & Mitterpacher, 1783) - greater thorn-tipped longhorn beetle
Pogonocherus hispidus (Linnaeus, 1758)
Pogonocherus marcoi Sama, 1993 inq.
Pogonocherus mixtus Haldeman, 1847
Pogonocherus neuhausi Müller, 1916
Pogonocherus parvulus LeConte, 1852
Pogonocherus perroudi Mulsant, 1839
Pogonocherus pictus Fall, 1910
Pogonocherus pilosipes Pic, 1907
Pogonocherus plasoni (Ganglbauer, 1884)
Pogonocherus sieversi (Ganglbauer, 1886)
Pogonocherus sturanii Sama & Schurmann, 1982
Pogonocherus ehdenensis Sama & Rapuzzi, 2000
Pogonocherus pesarinii Sama, 1993

References
 Biolib
 Fauna Europaea

Pogonocherini
Cerambycidae genera